This is a list of Chinese national-type primary schools (SJK(C)) in Sarawak, Malaysia. As of June 2022, there are 221 Chinese primary schools with a total of 59,681 students.

Statistics

Kuching Division

Bau District

Kuching District

Lundu District

Sri Aman Division

Sri Aman District

Lubok Antu District

Betong Division

Saratok District

Kabong District

Betong District

Pusa District

Sibu Division

Sibu District

Kanowit District

Selangau District

Mukah Division

Mukah District

Dalat District

Matu District

Daro District

Miri Division

Miri District

Marudi District

Beluru District

Telang Usan District

Subis District

Limbang Division

Limbang District

Lawas District

Sarikei Division

Sarikei District

Julau District

Meradong District

Kapit Division

Kapit District

Song District

Samarahan Division

Samarahan District

Asajaya District

Simunjan District

Serian Division

Serian District

Bintulu Division

Bintulu District

Sebauh District

Tatau District

See also 

 Lists of Chinese national-type primary schools in Malaysia

References

Schools in Sarawak
Sarawak
Chinese-language schools in Malaysia